The self-care deficit nursing theory is a grand nursing theory that was developed between 1959 and 2001 by Dorothea Orem. The theory is also referred to as the Orem's Model of Nursing. It is particularly used in rehabilitation and primary care settings, where the patient is encouraged to be as independent as possible.

Central philosophy
The nursing theory is based upon the philosophy that all "patients wish to care for themselves".  They can recover more quickly and holistically if they are allowed to perform their own self-cares to the best of their ability. Orem's self-care deficit nursing theory emphasized on establishing the nursing perspectives regarding human and practice.

Self-care requisites
Self-care requisites are groups of needs or requirements that Orem identified. They are classified as either:
Universal self-care requisites: those needs that all people have
Developmental self-care requisites
1. maturational: progress toward higher levels of maturation. 
2. situational: prevention of deleterious effects related to development.
Health deviation requisites: those needs that arise as a result of a patient's condition

Self-care deficits
When an individual is unable to meet their own self-care requisites, a "self-care deficit" occurs. It is the job of the Registered Nurse to determine these deficits, and define a support modality.

Support modalities
Nurses are encouraged to rate their patient's dependencies or each of the self-care deficits on the following scale:

 Total Compensation
 Partial Compensation
 Educative/Supportive
Sociocultural alsi

Universal Self-Care Requisites (SCRs)
The Universal Self-Care Requisites that are needed for health are:

Air
 Water
 Food
 Elimination
 Activity and Rest
 Solitude and Social Interaction
 Hazard Prevention
 Promotion of Normality

The nurse is encouraged to assign a support modality to each of the self-care requisites.

References 

 Dorothea Orem's Self-Care Theory
 Dorothea Orem's Self-Care Deficit Nursing Theory
 Hartweg, Donna (1991). Dorothea Orem: Self-Care Deficit Theory. Notes on Nursing Theories 4. Sage Publications. p. 1. 
 Renpenning KM, SozWiss GB, Denyes MJ, Orem DE, Taylor SG. Nurs Sci Q. 2011 Explication of the nature and meaning of nursing diagnosis.Apr;24(2):130-6. doi: 10.1177/0894318411399451
 Orem DE, Taylor SG.Nurs Sci Q. 2011 Reflections on nursing practice science: the nature, the structure, and the foundation of nursing sciences.Jan;24(1):35-41. doi: 10.1177/0894318410389
 Medical Archives of the Johns Hopkins Medical Institutions Dorothea Orem Collection

Nursing theory